Brishin Patel is an Indian politician. He was elected to the Lok Sabha, the lower house of the Parliament of India from the Siwan in Bihar as a member of the Janata Dal. He was Minister of Education and Transport in Nitish Kumar cabinet.

He joined Hindustani Awam Morcha when former Chief Minister of Bihar, Jitan Ram Manjhi, who left the Janata Dal (United) along with 18 others to form the party following the 2015 Bihar political crisis. He lost Vaishali seat in 2015 Bihar Legislative Assembly election. He was named as state president of Hindustani Awam Morcha. He left HAM Party and later joined RJD in 2020, before Bihar Assembly Election 2020.

References

External links
Official biographical sketch in Parliament of India website

People from Hajipur
1946 births
Janata Dal politicians
India MPs 1991–1996
Living people
Members of the Bihar Legislative Assembly
People from Vaishali district
Hindustani Awam Morcha politicians
Janata Dal (United) politicians